KBDV (92.7 FM, "Eagle 92.7") is a radio station broadcasting an adult contemporary music format. Licensed to Leesville, Louisiana, United States, the station is currently owned by Baldridge-Dumas Communications, Inc.

History
The Federal Communications Commission issued a construction permit for the station on May 18, 2007. The station was assigned the KBDV call sign on January 14, 2008, and received its license to cover on September 18, 2008.

References

External links

Radio stations in Louisiana
Mainstream adult contemporary radio stations in the United States
Radio stations established in 2008